The Burglar is a 1917 American silent drama film directed by Harley Knoles and starring Carlyle Blackwell, Madge Evans and Evelyn Greeley.

Plot summary

Cast
 Carlyle Blackwell as William Lewis 
 Madge Evans as Editha 
 Evelyn Greeley as Alice Hamilton 
 Harry Lamont as Sid Burns 
 Richard Clarke as William's Father 
 Justine Cutting as William's Stepmother 
 Rosina Henley as Fanny Hamilton 
 Frank Mayo as Paul Benton 
 Victor Kennard as Ned Hamilton 
 Jack Drumier as John Hamilton 
 Henry Drehle as Rural Policeman

References

Bibliography
 Langman, Larry. American Film Cycles: The Silent Era. Greenwood Publishing, 1998.

External links
 
 
 
 

1917 films
1917 drama films
1910s English-language films
American silent feature films
Silent American drama films
Films directed by Harley Knoles
American black-and-white films
World Film Company films
1910s American films